Ellie Stewart (born 2 November 1996) is an English association football defender who most recently played for Liverpool Feds in the FA Women's National League North.

References

External links 
 
 FA player profile
 Everton player profile
 
 

1996 births
Living people
Everton F.C. (women) players
English women's footballers
Women's association football defenders
Liverpool F.C. Women players
Blackburn Rovers L.F.C. players
Women's Super League players
Footballers from Liverpool
Sunderland A.F.C. Ladies players